Gregg Bissonette (born June 9, 1959) is an American jazz and rock drummer and vocalist. He is the brother of bassist Matt Bissonette, with whom he frequently collaborates. He has played on albums by dozens of recording artists, including David Lee Roth's first three solo albums.

Career
One of Bissonette's first recordings was on jazz trumpet legend Maynard Ferguson's Live from San Francisco in 1983.  Brother Matt was also in the band and on the recording.  He later appeared on Brandon Fields' The Other Side of the Story in 1985. It featured David Garfield on keyboards. A few years later Bissonette would start playing shows with Fields, Garfield and Steve Lukather on guitar and with John Peña on bass as Los Lobotomys. These shows took place at the Baked Potato, a jazz club and restaurant in Los Angeles, California, playing rock, Latin, and jazz.

Bissonnette got his big break joining former Van Halen frontman David Lee Roth. The band included guitarist Steve Vai and future Mr. Big bassist Billy Sheehan. During 1985-1992 Gregg appeared on all three US Billboard 200 hit albums Eat 'Em and Smile (no.4) Skyscraper (no.6) and A Little Ain't Enough (no.18) and the subsequent world tours.

In 1990 and 1993, Bissonette released drum videos Private Lesson and Playing, Reading & Soloing with a Band, respectively. Private Lesson covers a variety of topics including double bass drumming, rudiments (with a backsticking technique from the snare drum solo Tornado by Mitch Markovich), playing with a metronome and brushes.

From 1994 to 2004, he played on the musical interludes for every episode for the TV show Friends.

In late 1995, Toto was beginning their Tambu tour when Simon Phillips developed back problems. Phillips asked Bissonette to fill in for him during the tour's first leg.

He played drums on one track on Santana's album Supernatural (1999). In 2007, he recorded on the album La La Land by Daniel Glen Timms.

In 2001 he was set to play on the Electric Light Orchestra's Zoom Tour Live with his brother Matt on Bass. The tour was cancelled after one televised performance at the CBS Television City on PBS.

Bissonette started playing double drums with Ringo Starr in 2003 in his band Ringo and The Roundheads. This band also included his brother Matt Bissonette on bass. Gregg has been a member of Ringo Starr and his All Starr Band since. (2008-present)

In 2013 Bissonette released his 3rd solo album where he plays drums and sings called Warning Will Robinson. This album also features his brother Matt on bass and backing vocals.

Bissonette played on Steve Lukather's 2021 album, I Found the Sun Again. With 8 songs on the album, he played 7 songs while Ringo Starr played 1.

2021 was the release of The Reddcoats debut album. The album features Gregg and Matt Bissonette on drums and bass with Andy Timmons on guitar, Wally Minko on keyboards and Mike Medina on percussion.

Also in 2021 was the release of the debut album of The Red Locusts, again with Gregg on drums and his brother Matt on bass with Rick Springfield on guitar and vocals.

Bissonette can be heard on a number of rock instrumental and progressive rock albums, including The Extremist by Joe Satriani, Temporal by Shadrane, Deep Forest by Deep Forest, Bass Invader by Martin Motnik, Inner Galactic Fusion Experience by Richie Kotzen, Shadow King by Steve Fister, Revolution Road by Rocket Scientists, In the Eye of Time by Vox Tempus, Bug Alley and the soundtrack to the movie The Endless Summer II by Gary Hoey.

In 2012, Bissonette played drums on several tracks featured on Docker's Guild's album The Mystic Technocracy: Season 1: The Age of Ignorance, the progressive rock space opera masterminded by the French-American musician, teacher, and ethno-musicologist Douglas R. Docker.

Discography

Television soundtracks
 Mad About You
 King of the Hill
 Just Shoot Me!
 Friends
 Jeopardy!
 Wheel of Fortune

Movie soundtracks
Gregg Bissonette's movie soundtrack credits include the following:

 The Devil Wears Prada
 Bourne Supremacy
 Sex and the City
 Superbad
 Encino Man
 Payback (1999)
 The Endless Summer II
 Waiting for Guffman
 For Your Consideration
 Best in Show
 Hope Floats
 The Craft
 A Mighty Wind
 2 Days in the Valley
 The Bucket List
 Forgetting Sarah Marshall
 Finding Nemo
 American Pie
 American Pie 2

See also

References

External links
 
 Drummerworld: Greg Bissonette
 

1959 births
American jazz drummers
American rock drummers
Electric Light Orchestra members
Living people
Musicians from Detroit
University of North Texas College of Music alumni
Globus (music)
American performance artists
20th-century American drummers
American male drummers
Jazz musicians from Michigan
American male jazz musicians
Favored Nations artists
Ringo Starr & His All-Starr Band members
The Red Locusts members